KDKA may refer to:

 KDKA (AM), a radio station (1020 AM) licensed to Pittsburgh, Pennsylvania, United States
 KDKA-TV, a television station (channel 2) licensed to Pittsburgh, Pennsylvania, United States
 KDKA-FM, a radio station (93.7 FM) licensed to Pittsburgh, Pennsylvania, United States
 WLTJ, a radio station (92.9 FM) licensed to Pittsburgh, Pennsylvania, United States, which used the call letters KDKA-FM until 1979
 3-Deoxy-D-manno-octulosonic acid kinase, an enzyme